The 1998 World Men's Curling Championship (branded as 1998 Ford World Men's Curling Championship for sponsorship reasons) was held at Riverside Coliseum in Kamloops, British Columbia from April 4–12, 1998.

Teams

Round-robin standings

Round-robin results

Draw 1

Draw 2

Draw 3

Draw 4

Draw 5

Draw 6

Draw 7

Draw 8

Draw 9

Tiebreaker

Playoffs

Brackets

Final

References
 
 Video: 

W
World Men's Curling Championship
Sport in Kamloops
1998 in Canadian curling
Curling in British Columbia
International sports competitions hosted by Canada
Sports competitions in British Columbia
April 1998 sports events in Canada
1998 in British Columbia